The 2017–18 MDFA Elite Division is the 105th season of the MDFA Elite Division, the top-tier football league in Mumbai, a city in the Indian state of Maharashtra.

Format 

The 13 teams will play Preliminary League on a single leg basis. The two teams standing 1st and 2nd after completion of the Preliminary League will be declared the winner and runner-up of the MDFA Elite Division. The Two teams standing last after completion of the Preliminary league will be demoted to the Super Division of the 2018-19 season. The matches will be played at Cooperage Football Ground and Mumbai Football Arena. The league will commence from 1 September 2017.

Teams

Table

Results table

References

MDFA Elite Division
2017–18 in Indian football leagues